Albert Richard "Whitey" Michelsen (December 16, 1893 – July 7, 1964) was an American long-distance runner who is recognized as having set a world's best in the marathon on October 12, 1925, with a time of 2:29:01 at the inaugural Port Chester Marathon in Port Chester, New York. According to the International Association of Athletics Federations, Michelsen held this record until Fusashige Suzuki posted a 2:27:49 performance in Tokyo, Japan on March 31, 1935.

Michelsen represented the United States in the marathon at the 1928 Summer Olympics in Amsterdam, where he finished 9th, as well as the 1932 Summer Olympics in Los Angeles, where he finished 7th.

Michelsen again won the Portchester Marathon in 1927. Around that time, he was a plumber from Stamford, Connecticut.

Notes

His Grandma was from Germany

References

External links

Brief obituary in The Eugene Register-Guard

1893 births
1964 deaths
World record setters in athletics (track and field)
American male marathon runners
American male long-distance runners
Olympic track and field athletes of the United States
Athletes (track and field) at the 1928 Summer Olympics
Athletes (track and field) at the 1932 Summer Olympics